The United States Coast Guard Academy (USCGA) is a service academy of the United States Coast Guard in New London, Connecticut. Founded in 1876, it is the smallest of the five U.S. service academies and provides education to future Coast Guard officers in one of nine major fields of study.

Students are officers-in-training and are referred to as cadets, and upon graduation receive a Bachelor of Science degree and are commissioned as Coast Guard ensigns with a five-year active-duty service obligation, with additional years if the graduate attends flight school or subsequent government-funded graduate school. Out of approximately 250 cadets entering the academy each summer, around 200 graduate. Cadets can choose from among nine majors, with a curriculum that is graded according to their performance in a holistic program of academics, physical fitness, character, and leadership.

Cadets are required to adhere to the academy's "Honor Concept," "Who lives here reveres honor, honors duty," which is emblazoned in the walls of the academy's entrance. The academy's motto is Scientiæ cedit mare, which is Latin for "the sea yields to knowledge". Its academic programs are accredited by the New England Commission of Higher Education.

History

The roots of the academy lie in the School of Instruction of the Revenue Cutter Service, the school of the Revenue Cutter Service. The School of Instruction was established near New Bedford, Massachusetts in 1876 and used USRC Dobbin for its exercises.  Captain John Henriques served as superintendent from founding until 1883. The one civilian instructor was Professor Edwin Emery, who taught mathematics, astronomy, English composition, French, physics, theoretical steam engineering, history, international law, and revenue law, among other subjects. The school was a two-year apprenticeship, in essence, supplemented by minimal classroom work. The student body averaged five to ten cadets per class. With changes to new training vessels, the school moved to Curtis Bay, Maryland in 1900 and to Fort Trumbull in 1910, a Revolutionary War–era Army installation in New London, Connecticut. In 1914, the school became the Revenue Cutter Academy, and then the Coast Guard Academy in 1915 with the merger of the Revenue Cutter Service and the Life Saving Service to form the U.S. Coast Guard.

Land was purchased in New London on 31 July 1930 for the construction of the Coast Guard Academy. The 40-acre site was made up of two parcels from the Allyn and Payne estates and was purchased for $100,000.  The $100,000 was not raised through a bond issue, as originally planned, but with a bank loan based on uncollected back taxes. The contract was awarded to Murch Brothers Construction Company of St. Louis and ground was broken in January 1931 by Jean Hamlet, daughter of Rear Admiral Harry G. Hamlet, Academy Superintendent from 1928 to 1932. On 15 May 1931, Treasury Secretary Andrew W. Mellon visited New London to lay the cornerstone of Hamilton Hall. Construction proceeded relatively on schedule and cadets moved in to the new buildings on 20 September 1932.

In 1946, the academy received the barque Horst Wessel as a war reparation from Germany, a 295-foot tall ship which was renamed . It remains the main training vessel for cadets at the academy as well as for officer candidates at the Coast Guard's Officer Candidate School, which is located on the grounds of the academy.

The academy was racially integrated in 1962 at the request of President Kennedy. The academy began admitting women in 1976 at the request of Congress.

In 2018, the academy emblem was redesigned by Nick Desjardins of the Biddeford Regional Center of Technology.

Mission
Superintendent of the academy Vice Admiral Harry G. Hamlet composed the academy's mission statement in 1929. All entering cadets must memorize the statement during their first few days of Swab Summer, the indoctrination period for new cadets.

The mission of the United States Coast Guard Academy is to graduate young men and women with sound bodies, stout hearts and alert minds, with a liking for the sea and its lore, and with that high sense of Honor, Loyalty and Obedience which goes with trained initiative and leadership; well-grounded in seamanship, the sciences and the amenities, and strong in the resolve to be worthy of the traditions of commissioned officers in the United States Coast Guard, in the service of their country and humanity.

Admission

Unlike the other service academies, admission to the USCGA does not require a congressional nomination. This is due to the fervent objections of Captain John A. Henriques, the first Superintendent of the Revenue Cutter School of Instruction (later the Revenue Cutter Academy). His objection stemmed from years of poor political appointments in the U.S. Revenue Cutter Service's bureaucracy.

Each year more than 2,000 students apply and appointments are offered until the number accepting appointments to the incoming class numbers reaches approximately 400; the average entering class size is 300 cadets. Those who have received appointments as cadets report to the USCGA in late June or early July for "Swab Summer", a basic military training program designed to prepare them for the rigors of their Fourth Class year. After four years of study and training, approximately 200 of those cadets will graduate. About 35 percent of cadets are women.

Academics

All graduating cadets earn commissions as ensigns in the United States Coast Guard, as well as Bachelor of Science degrees. For that reason the academy maintains a core curriculum of science and professional development courses in addition to major-specific courses. Each cadet takes two semesters of classes during the school year and then spends the majority of the summer in military training to produce officers of character with the requisite professional skills. Among these are courses in leadership, ethics, organizational behavior, and nautical science. The majority of cadets report to their first units after graduating, which are either afloat units, shore units, or basic flight training as student naval aviators, with the training conducted under the auspices of the U.S. Navy.  Those that are assigned afloat serve as either deck watch officers or student engineers.  Professional maritime studies courses help prepare cadets in piloting, voyage planning, deck seamanship, and all aspects of shiphandling, as well as Coast Guard leadership and administrative duties.

Majors
Academics at the USCGA stress the sciences and engineering, but different courses of study are available. In addition, several of the majors offer tracks of specialization (for example, Marine and Environmental Science majors can choose to focus on biology, chemistry, or geophysics). Cadets sometimes opt to take elective courses with Connecticut College (adjacent the academy's campus) as part of an open exchange agreement.

Military training

Each summer, cadets participate in training programs according to their class. The summers are organized as follows:
 Swab Summer: The new class of freshmen report in to the Academy, and are sworn into the military. They undergo a seven-week basic training program that culminates on a week-long voyage underway on the barque USCGC Eagle.
 Third-class (3/c) Summer: Five weeks aboard the USCGC Eagle training under sail, five weeks aboard an operational Coast Guard cutter or small boat station in the role of junior enlisted (i.e., standing watches as helmsman, lookout, quartermaster of the watch, or engineering watch).
 Second-class (2/c) Summer: Damage control training, weapon qualifications, navigation rules certification, aviation internship, sail training program, and three weeks as members of the cadre, who train the incoming Swabs.
 First-class (1/c) Summer: Ten weeks aboard an operational cutter in the role of a junior officer (i.e., standing bridge watches conning the ship as Officer of the Deck), or an optional internship for exceptional cadets who split their summer with five weeks at an internship and five weeks aboard a cutter.

Each week during the school year cadets participate in Regimental Review, a formal military drill. In addition, cadets perform a variety of military duties at the academy. Like all cadets and midshipmen at the United States service academies, Coast Guard cadets are on active duty in the military and wear uniforms at all times. Cadets receive a monthly stipend to pay for books, uniforms, and other necessities. Cadets receive monthly pay of $1,017.00, as of 2015. From this amount, pay is automatically deducted for the cost of uniforms, books, supplies, services, and other miscellaneous expenses.

Organization of the Corps of Cadets
The Corps is organized as one regiment divided into eight companies, each of which is composed of about 120 cadets of all classes. Although the Corps of Cadets is supervised directly by the Commandant of Cadets (a Coast Guard officer with the rank of captain), the academy operates on the concept of "the Corps leading the Corps."

The Corps of Cadets is largely a self-directed organization that follows a standard military chain of command:
 1st class cadets lead the Corps
 2nd class cadets are cadre in Swab Summer training and are primarily responsible for leading and developing 4th class cadets. They serve as mentors
 3rd class cadets are role models to 4th class cadets
 4th class cadets are responsible for learning and applying Coast Guard core values such as leadership, teamwork, attention to detail, accountability, etc.

The highest-ranking cadet in each company is the Company Commander, a first-class cadet ("firstie"), equivalent to a senior.  Although each company has some leeway in their standards and practices, every company commander reports to the Regimental Staff which plans and oversees all aspects of cadet life. At the top of the cadet chain of command is the Regimental Commander, the highest ranking cadet. Command positions, both in companies and on Regimental Staff, are highly competitive, and a cadet's overall class rank is often a deciding factor in who is awarded the position.

The eight companies are named for the first eight letters of the NATO phonetic alphabet. Each has a special focus in administering day-to-day affairs: Alpha Company manages health and wellness. Bravo Company runs training. Charlie Company administers the honor system, Delta Company coordinates drill and ceremonies. Echo Company manages transportation and logistics. Foxtrot Company operates the cadet conduct system, organizes the watch rotations, and updates the cadet regulations. Golf Company is in charge of supplies for cleaning and repairing damaged rooms within Chase Hall. Hotel Company is in charge of morale events. 

To accomplish their missions, each company is divided, along shipboard lines, into three departments, each of which is divided into divisions with specific responsibilities. Divisions are the most basic unit at the Coast Guard Academy, and each has a very specific purpose. Each division is led by a firstie and contains several members of each other class.

This organizational structure is designed to give every cadet a position of leadership and to emulate the structure of a Coast Guard cutter, in which the division officer and department head positions are filled by junior officers. Third-class cadets directly mentor the fourth-class in their division, just as junior petty officers would be responsible for the most junior enlisted personnel (non-rates). Second-class cadets act as non-commissioned officers, and ensure that the regulations and accountability are upheld. Firsties (like junior officers) are in supervisory roles, and are responsible for carrying out the mission of their divisions and ensuring the well-being of those under their command.  Exchange cadets from the other federal service academies are also a part of the Corps, and take part in many activities alongside their USCGA counterparts.

Extracurricular activities

Athletics

The USCGA Athletic Department offers 24 intercollegiate sports for cadets. The academy's athletics teams generally compete in Division III of the National Collegiate Athletic Association. Cadets devote two hours per academic day to athletic activities, either on varsity teams, club teams, or other sports pursuits. The academy nickname is the Bears, after the USRC Bear, which made a dramatic rescue in Alaska in 1897, shortly after the opening of the academy.

Music
Principal non-athletic activities are musical centered on Leamy Hall. Regimental Band, Windjammers Drum & Bugle Corps, various pep bands, and the NiteCaps Jazz Band are instrumental programs. Chapel Choirs, Glee Club, the Fairwinds all-female a cappella group, and The Idlers all-male sea shanty group are vocal programs.

Model UN
The academy's Model UN team was started in 2004, and has since been successfully competing around North America, and at the World Model UN Conference.

Traditions

Links in the Chain
For years it has been a United States Coast Guard Academy tradition for fourth-class cadets (freshman) to hide the chain links that sit outside the cadet library, also known as Waesche Hall. The chain links are historic: they were used during the Revolutionary War to prevent ships from transiting up the Hudson River and attacking West Point. When Benedict Arnold betrayed the United States, the chain links were one of the secrets that he revealed to the British. The family that originally forged the chain donated the links to the United States Coast Guard Academy. Since the donation, the fourth-classmen (freshmen) are challenged each year at the annual homecoming football game to outwit the second-classmen (juniors) and keep the chain hidden until half-time. If the fourth-classmen are successful in hiding the links until the end of the second quarter, they are granted a week of modified carry-on (this allows the fourth-classmen to have some of the privileges of the upperclassmen).

Indoc
As part of their indoctrination into military culture, and to condition them for the frenetic flow of information during a shipboard watch, 4/c cadets are forced to sharpen their attention to detail and to develop an ability to accurately recall seemingly trivial facts from short- and medium-term memory. The incoming class of cadets every year is required to memorize various quotes, Coast Guard facts, and bits of information that change during the year. They are responsible for knowing reams of information like the menu for the next three meals in the Wardroom (dining hall), the mission of the Academy, the entire chain of command, each athletic team's next scheduled opponent, the lengths of different types of Coast Guard Cutters, the meanings of all the different nautical flags, and the finer points of various military ceremonies.

Indoc during the Swab Summer training program also includes humorous questions that cement the identity of a class, such as "How's the cow?" A swab from the Class of 2022 would be required to reply, "Sir/Ma'am, she walks, she talks, she's full of chalk; the lacteal fluid extracted from the female of the bovine species is highly prolific to the 22nd degree, sir/ma'am!".

Notable alumni
Alumni of the Coast Guard Academy are known collectively as the "Long Blue Line".

U.S. Coast Guard Museum

The U.S. Coast Guard Museum is located in Waesche Hall on the grounds of the United States Coast Guard Academy.  The museum's artifacts reflect the history of the U.S. Coast Guard and include ship models, carved figureheads, cannons, uniforms, medals, weapons, memorabilia and paintings. Visitors must bring a government-issued photo identification to enter the campus, and foreign visitors must make an appointment with the Curator before visiting the museum.

See also
 United States Military Academy
 United States Naval Academy
 United States Air Force Academy
 United States Merchant Marine Academy
 Army University
 USCGC Eagle (WIX-327), a training ship originally built in Nazi Germany as the Horst Wessel

References
Notes

Further reading
 Lovell, John P. (1979) Neither Athens nor Sparta?: The American Service Academies in Transition

External links

 Official website

 
Academy
Universities and colleges in Connecticut
Military academies of the United States
Maritime colleges in the United States
Coast guard academies
Long Island Sound
Tourist attractions in New London, Connecticut
Buildings and structures in New London, Connecticut
Educational institutions established in 1876
Educational institutions established in 1915
Universities and colleges in New London County, Connecticut
1876 establishments in Massachusetts
1910 establishments in Connecticut
Water transportation in Connecticut
United States military service academies